Marrable is a surname. Notable people with the surname include:

Frederick Marrable (1819–1872), British architect
Madeline Marrable (1833–1916), British painter